Bhaskaracharya College of Applied Sciences (BCAS) is a constituent public college of the University of Delhi. Established in 1995, it offers undergraduate courses in various disciplines of sciences and applied sciences. Ranked 25th among colleges in all over India by the National Institutional Ranking Framework (NIRF) in 2022, the institution has produced distinguished alumni in the field of science. It has been honoured with 'Star College' status by the Ministry of Science and Technology (Government of India). Alumni of this college are called 'Old Bhaskaracharyan'.

History 
Bhaskaracharya College of Applied Sciences was established in the year 1995. It was named after Bhaskaracharya, the greatest astronomer and mathematician who introduced concept of 'infinity'. He is referred as Bhāskara II to avoid confusion with Bhāskara I of the seventh century AD.

Campus 
The college is spread over  possesses infrastructure including class-rooms, free wi-fi, central library, computer center, digital resource center, common rooms, open air theatre (amphitheatre), fully airconditioned conference center, audio-visual (AV) auditorium as well as an airconditioned central cafeteria. The college also has a national level lawn tennis, badminton and basketball ground, a football and cricket ground, gymnasium as well as a nature park.

Departments 
Department of Microbiology
Department of Physics
Department of Chemistry
Department of Biochemistry
Department of Zoology
Department of Botany
Department of Biomedical Science
Department of Computer Science 
Department of Polymer Science
Department of Mathematics
Department of Electronics
Department of Food Technology
Department of Instrumentation
Department of Human Communication
Department of physical education

Admission  
Admission to all courses is being carried out through Common University Entrance Test (CUET UG).

Ranking 

The college was ranked 25th in all over India college ranking done by National Institutional Ranking Framework in 2022. It is also accredited by National Assessment and Accreditation Council (NAAC) and IQAC.

Student life 
Societies

Student clubs and societies have always played an important role in the life of the college, and are seen as vital to student development. Each academic subject has a society which sponsors lectures and discussions. The popular extra-curricular societies and clubs engage in activities concerned with debating, dramatics, wall climbing and trekking, film, social service, photography, quizzing and astronomy. The social service alliance is the largest and most active society of Bhaskaracharya College which follows the mantra "Service is our motto wherever we go". It works for the betterment of the underprivileged sections of the society. In continuance of a long tradition, the Planning cell regularly invites distinguished visitors to address and join issue with students on various topical issues. The college also publishes department newsletters, college magazines and yearbooks. Several departments also publish their annual journals aside from the college publications.

Societies and extra curricular activities (ECA) include:

Sukshmjeev Society (Department of Microbiology)
Sensors Society (Department of Instrumentation)
Atelier (literary club)
Darpan (dramatics society)
Clickerati (photography club)
Eco club
Moksha (music club)
Astronomy club
Dance club
Debate club
Film club
Modern & Fine Arts club
Yoga club

Students' Union

The college has a students' union and its office bearers are elected by the students. The Students' Union organizes annual festival of BCAS, and addresses all student-related problems.

Placement 
Another important facet of the college activities is its training and placement Cell. The placement cell ensures that all pass-outs are properly placed. In order to impart in-hand training and technical expertise to the students, the college interacts with various government and industrial setups of repute. Also, as part of the course curriculum, the students have to undergo training for two months in various organizations. The institute has been receiving a tremendous support from the industries and various research organizations for arranging placement training/workshops/seminars/talks for the students.

Notable alumni 
Alumni and students of Bhaskaracharya College are called "Bhaskaracharyan". The college has produced many distinguished alumni including scientists, mathematicians, educators, writers, bureaucrats, entrepreneurs and sportspersons.

References

External links 
 Official College Website

Universities and colleges in Delhi
1995 establishments in Delhi
Educational institutions established in 1995